The , also called the , was a ship class of two large armoured cruisers (Sōkō jun'yōkan) built for the Imperial Japanese Navy after the Russo-Japanese War of 1904–1905. These ships reflected Japanese experiences during that war as they were designed to fight side-by-side with battleships and were given an armament equal to, or superior to existing Japanese battleships. The development of the battlecruiser the year before  was completed made her and her sister ship  obsolete before they were completed because the foreign battlecruisers were much more heavily armed and faster.

Both ships played a small role in World War I as they unsuccessfully hunted for the German East Asia Squadron and the commerce-raider  and protected troop convoys in the Pacific Ocean shortly after the war began. The ships were sold for scrap in 1923 in accordance with the terms of the Washington Naval Treaty.

Design and description

The Ibuki-class ships were originally ordered during the Russo-Japanese War, on 31 January 1905, as  armored cruisers. Before construction began, however, they were redesigned to incorporate  guns in four twin turrets rather than the dozen  guns in single mounts of the earlier ships. This required a larger hull to fit the turrets and thus more power from additional boilers to keep the same speed as the Tsukuba-class ships.

These ships were given battleship-grade armament to overpower existing armored cruisers and were intended to fight in the battleline with battleships, much as had the two  armored cruisers had done in the Battles of the Yellow Sea and Tsushima during the Russo-Japanese War. While more powerful than existing armored cruisers, the appearance of the British  in 1908 with their armament of eight  guns and speed of  rendered these ships obsolete before they were commissioned. They were reclassified as battlecruisers in 1912.

The crew numbered about 845 officers and enlisted men.

Propulsion
Both ships were intended to be powered by vertical triple-expansion steam engines, but the long construction delays suffered by Ibuki made it possible for her to serve as a test-bed for the steam turbine. Four sets of Curtis turbines were ordered from the Fore River Shipbuilding Co., two each for Ibuki and the battleship . A month later, the Japanese paid $100,000 for a manufacturing license for the turbines.

The turbines were subsequently modified and the propellers were changed in an attempt to rectify the problem, but with only limited success.

She used the same type of boiler as Ibuki and derived the additional power from the addition of four boilers, for a total of 28, which required an additional funnel.

Armament
The Ibuki-class armored cruisers were armed with four 45-caliber 12-inch 41st Year Type guns, mounted in twin-gun hydraulically powered centreline turrets. The guns had an elevation range of −3°/+23° and normally loaded their rounds at an angle of +5°, although loading at any angle up to +13° was theoretically possible. The intermediate armament was much heavier than the older ships, with four twin-gun turrets equipped with 45-calibre 8-inch 41st Year Type guns mounted on each side.

Defense against torpedo boats was mainly provided by fourteen 40-caliber 4.7-inch 41st Year Type quick-firing (QF) guns, all but two of which were mounted in casemates in the sides of the hull. The ships were also equipped with four 40-caliber 12-pounder 12 cwt QF guns and four 23-caliber 12-pounder QF guns on high-angle mounts. In addition, the cruisers were fitted with three submerged  torpedo tubes, one on each broadside and one in the stern. Each tube was provided with one training torpedo and two normal torpedoes.

Armor
Armor in the Ibuki class was improved compared to the earlier ships. Above it was a strake of  armor that extended between the eight-inch gun turrets and protected the two central 4.7-inch casemates. The ends of the main armor belt were connected to the main gun barbettes by  transverse bulkheads.

The armour for the eight-inch turrets was six inches thick. The main barbettes were protected by seven inches of armour and the secondary barbettes by five inches, although the armor for those thinned to  behind the upper armor belt. The thickness of the armored decks was two inches throughout the ship. The sides of the forward conning tower were eight inches thick and its communications tube to the main deck was seven inches in thickness.

Ships

Construction and service
Construction of both ships was delayed by a lack of facilities at their shipyards, a shortage of appropriately trained workers and their low priority for building. Ibuki had to wait to have her keel laid until the slipway used by the battleship  became available after Aki was launched. Kure Naval Arsenal took advantage of the delay with Ibuki to stockpile material and components and set a record between keel-laying and launching of five months, a figure only bettered by Portsmouth Naval Dockyard when they built the battleship  in only four months. The decision to switch from reciprocating engines to turbines in Ibuki and Aki was not made until five days after Ibukis launching and thereafter she received priority over the battleship so that she was completed less than two years later, the first ship in the Imperial Japanese Navy to use steam turbines. In fact, construction on Aki was completely halted for about five months in favor of Ibuki because the former's turbines were late and the cruiser was better suited to serve as the testbed for the new technology.

Ibuki sailed to Thailand in 1911 to represent Japan during the coronation ceremony of King Rama VI Vajiravudh.
When World War I began in August 1914, she was commanded by Captain Kanji Katō. The ship was ordered to Singapore and cooperated with the British to hunt down the light cruiser Emden in the East Indies and Indian Ocean. Ibuki was ordered to New Zealand to escort a large troop convoy of ANZAC troops to the Middle East in late September. She was ordered to guard the convoy, over Katō's protests, when the presence of the Emden was discovered in the Cocos Islands on 9 November. The Australian light cruiser HMAS Sydney was detached from the convoy to sink the Emden instead. With the ending of the threat to the convoy, Ibuki was transferred to the Second South Seas Squadron at Truk in the Caroline Islands. She was refitted at Kure in 1918, disarmed in 1922, and stricken from the Navy List the following year and scrapped in accordance with the Washington Naval Treaty. Her guns were turned over to the Imperial Japanese Army which emplaced one main-gun turret in the Tsugaru Strait between Honshu and Hokkaido and another in the Hōyo Strait in 1929.

Kurama attended the Coronation Fleet Review of King George V in Spithead on 24 June 1911. She was at Yokosuka in August 1914 and was assigned to the 1st South Seas Squadron to search for the East Asia Squadron. They departed there on 14 September and reached Truk on 11 October as troops carried by the squadron occupied the Carolines. The squadron was based in Suva, Fiji in November in case the East Asia Squadron decided to double back into the Central Pacific. Kurama was flagship of the 2nd Squadron in 1917 and was transferred to the 5th Squadron the following year. Like her sister, she was disarmed in 1922, stricken in 1923 and subsequently scrapped. Two of her 203 mm turrets were subsequently emplaced as coastal artillery around Tokyo Bay.

Notes

Footnotes

References

External links
 New Japanese Armoured Cruiser Ibuki Contemporary discussion with specifications, photo & armor plan.

Cruiser classes
Battlecruiser classes